is a Japanese footballer currently playing as a midfielder for Fukushima United.

Career statistics

Club
.

Notes

References

2002 births
Living people
Japanese footballers
Association football midfielders
J3 League players
Fukushima United FC players